Asseco Resovia Rzeszów 2014–2015 season is the 2014/2015 volleyball season for Polish professional volleyball club Asseco Resovia Rzeszów.

The club competes in:
 Polish Championship
 Polish Cup
 CEV Champions League

Team Roster Season 2014-2015
Head coach:  Andrzej Kowal

Squad changes for the 2014–2015 season
In:

Out:

Most Valuable Players

PlusLiga

General classification

Results, schedules and standings

2014–15 PlusLiga

Regular season

Quarterfinal

Semifinal

Finale

2014–15 Polish Cup

Quarterfinal

Semifinal

Finale

2014–15 CEV Champions League

Pool C

Playoff 12

Playoff 6

Final Four

References

Resovia (volleyball) seasons